Georgy Grebenkov (born 8 January 1982) is a Russian gymnast. He competed at the 2004 Summer Olympics. In 1998, he won the silver medal in the men's junior all-around event at the 1998 European Men's Artistic Gymnastics Championships held in Saint Petersburg, Russia.

See also
List of Olympic male artistic gymnasts for Russia

References

External links
 

1982 births
Living people
Russian male artistic gymnasts
Olympic gymnasts of Russia
Gymnasts at the 2004 Summer Olympics
Gymnasts from Saint Petersburg
21st-century Russian people